Allpamayu may refer to:

Allpamayu (Ancash), river in Peru
Allpamayu (Cusco), river in Peru